Henry Roe Cloud (December 28, 1884 – February 9, 1950) was a Ho-Chunk Native American, enrolled in the Winnebago Tribe of Nebraska, who served as an educator, college administrator, U.S. federal government official (in the Office of Indian Affairs), Presbyterian minister, and reformer.

Early life
Henry Roe Cloud was born December 28, 1884, a member of the Bird Clan, on the Winnebago Reservation in northeastern Nebraska and was orphaned when his parents died in 1896 and 1897. After his education in a series of government schools, his intellectual ambition, academic performance, and personal qualities brought him in 1901 to the private Mount Hermon Preparatory School (now Northfield Mount Hermon School) in Massachusetts. He financed his education through the school's work-study program and was introduced to the social circles of America's ruling elite. He graduated a salutatorian in 1906 and the school served as his conduit into the Ivy League.

College education
Cloud was the first full-blood Native American to attend Yale University. He graduated with a bachelor of arts (B.A.) in psychology and philosophy from Yale College in 1910 and earned a master of arts (M.A.) degree in anthropology from Yale University in 1914.  He was a campus celebrity due to the force of his personality and speaking skills, and in an era when rhetoric was an art, he was especially accomplished, attracting large audiences on campus and in national venues. One measure of his prestige as an undergraduate was being tapped for the Yale senior society, Elihu.

Roe advocated for Indians to make a space for themselves in higher education both while still at Yale and shortly after. In 1914, he protested census figures of college attendance - noting that only a minute fraction of the Indian population was college bound. Shortly after, in the late 1920s Meriam Report, Roe Cloud voiced outrage at the under-education of Indians. Scholars such as Joel Pfister compare Roe Cloud's ideology on the education of Indian minorities to W.E.B. Dubois' theory of the "Talented Tenth" in African American culture. Roe Cloud helped organize efforts to form an Indian "Talented Tenth."

While an undergraduate, Cloud attended a lecture by the missionary, Mary Wickham Roe, a member of a prominent Yankee family involved in evangelical Christian mission work. He established a close relationship with her and her husband, Walter C. Roe. The couple adopted him, and he took their surname as his middle name.

From 1910-1911 he studied sociology at Oberlin College. He attended Auburn Theological Seminary in New York, where he earned a bachelor of divinity degree and was ordained as a Presbyterian minister in 1913. He returned to school and received a doctorate of divinity from Emporia College, Kansas in 1932.

Career
In a dissertation by a Purdue University scholar, Cloud's significance is described "as a reformer, an educator, and Indian Service official. As a prominent Indian figure of the 1920s and 1930s, Cloud's life demonstrates how and to what extent Indians were able to influence federal Indian policy. His life also provides a window into the close ties between progressive ideas and the evangelical Protestant Christianity that prompted and guided many of the reform efforts in the first decades of the twentieth century. Cloud's work also shows him to be capable of moving beyond this Progressive Era paradigm of assimilation and embracing new currents of reform such as the push for cultural pluralism."

His career with the Office of Indian Affairs and the Brookings Institution focused on the efforts to establish modern schools for Native American youth. He became superintendent of the Haskell Institute, now known as Haskell Indian Nations University, in Lawrence, Kansas, in 1933.

"Cloud was instrumental in winning acceptance of the Wheeler-Howard Act, known also as the Indian Reorganization Act of 1934."

In 1947, he was appointed the Superintendent of the Umatilla Indian Reservation. "In 1948, he was appointed regional representative for the Grande Ronde and Siletz Indian Agencies in Oregon."

Family 
Henry Roe Cloud's wife, Elizabeth Bender Roe Cloud (1888-1965), spoke widely on American Indian affairs, and served on the Indian Welfare Committee for the General Federation of Women’s Clubs, and won the American Mother of the Year Award in 1950 for her work.

His granddaughter, Renya Ramirez, is an American Studies professor at the University of California, Santa Cruz.

Death and legacy
Henry Roe Cloud died of a heart attack in Siletz, Oregon, on February 9, 1950. He was buried in Beaverton, Oregon. An entry on Cloud is included in the American National Biography, Vol 5 (1999) and his personal papers are housed as a distinct series in the "Roe Family Papers" in Sterling Memorial Library's Manuscripts and Archives collection at Yale University.

The majority of Cloud's papers, personal photographs, and documents (relating to Yale and the Mount Hermon school) and theological society parchments as well as papers from his work until his death in 1950 were in the care of Henry's Great Grandson, Shahn Roe Cloud Hughes in Portland, Oregon.

In November 2014, the items were donated to the Yale University Library, Manuscripts and Archives.  They are part of the Ravi D Goel Collection on Henry Roe Cloud.  Collection highlights include Cloud's candid thoughts on many Indian tribes, leading figures and the state of US-Indian affairs.  Almost all of the letters were addressed to his daughter Marion Roe Cloud Hughes.  A detailed April 1937 letter addresses Cloud's views on the Crees, Joseph Dussome, Baptiste Samatt, and Rocky Boy Superintendent Earl Wooldridge. In a February 14, 1938 letter, Cloud writes about a reunion with his Yale 1910 classmate and then Chinese Ambassador to the United States Wang Zhengting.  (See also Yale Manuscripts and Archives April 2015 blog, "Party Diplomacy: The Ravi D. Goel Collection on Henry Roe Cloud.")  In a January 12, 1939 letter, he writes of the opportunity to see his Yale classmate and US Senator Robert Taft on his upcoming visit to Washington, DC.

The Henry Roe Cloud conference was held at Yale in 2010, "celebrating 100 years of Native American education."

Yale University Press publishes a series of books, The Henry Roe Cloud Series on American Indians and Modernity.

Notes

Further reading

External links 

 
 
 A Celebration of Henry Roe Cloud and Yale's Native American Community, 2005 conference program
 The Henry Roe Cloud Medal, awarded by Yale 
 Doctoral Dissertation of Jason Tetzloff, Purdue University pdf 
 Burns, Kathleen. "Ink Spring 2006 Henry Roe Cloud, Yale's First Native American Graduate." Red Ink 1 no. 1 (2006): p. 13
 'Yale Celebrates First Native American Graduate: Henry Roe Cloud', Yale University Office of Public Affairs & Communications, 29 October 2010
 Exhibit celebrates life of Yale's first Native American alumnus
 Ravi D. Goel Collection on Henry Roe Cloud (MS 2008). Manuscripts and Archives, Yale University Library
 Tomecek, Christy (2015) Party Diplomacy: The Ravi D. Goel Collection on Henry Roe Cloud Manuscripts and Archives Blog, Yale University Library.

1884 births
1950 deaths
People from Thurston County, Nebraska
Winnebago Tribe of Nebraska people
Members of the Society of American Indians
American Presbyterian ministers
Native American leaders
Yale University alumni
Oberlin College alumni
Emporia State University alumni
People from Lincoln County, Oregon
Native American history of Oregon
Haskell Indian Nations University alumni
Burials in Oregon
Auburn Theological Seminary alumni
Northfield Mount Hermon School alumni
Educators from Nebraska
Educators from Oregon
Cloud family